The England national cricket team toured New Zealand in March 1947 and played a single Test match against the New Zealand national cricket team. The game was ruined by rain and ended in a draw. England were captained by Wally Hammond and New Zealand by Walter Hadlee, who scored 116.

Test series summary

References

1947 in English cricket
1947 in New Zealand cricket
New Zealand cricket seasons from 1945–46 to 1969–70
1946-47
International cricket competitions from 1945–46 to 1960